Jubani is a surname. Notable people with the surname include:

Daniel Jubani (born 1993), Albanian footballer 
Dom Simon Jubani (1927–2011), Catholic priest and Albanian political prisoner
Zef Jubani (1818–1880), Albanian folklorist, philosopher, and activist